Brooks County Courthouse may refer to:

Brooks County Courthouse (Georgia), Quitman, Georgia
Brooks County Courthouse (Texas), Falfurrias, Texas